Vincent Lamont Mason Jr. (born March 24, 1970) is an American rapper, producer and DJ who is one third of the hip hop group De La Soul. Mason is also known as Maseo, P.A. Pasemaster Mase and Plug Three.

Early life
Mason graduated from Amityville Memorial High School in 1988.

Career
Kelvin Mercer ("Posdnuos", "Plug One", "Plug Wonder Why", "Mercenary") and David Jude Jolicoeur ("Trugoy the Dove", "Plug Two", "Dave") were already friends when Mason joined the pair to form De La Soul in 1987. The trio came to the attention of Prince Paul, then a member of Stetsasonic, with a demo recording of "Plug Tunin'". Paul facilitated a record deal for Mason and his colleagues with the Tommy Boy label and produced their first album, 3 Feet High and Rising.

Mason's role in De La Soul is primarily that of a DJ, with Mason stating that he is “a b-boy to my heart”, drawing inspiration from life experience and contemporary global events. However, Mason has also featured as a vocalist on songs such as "Ring Ring Ring (Ha Ha Hey)" (from De La Soul Is Dead) and for De La Soul's guest appearance on the Jungle Brothers recording, "Doin' Our Own Dang". Mason also recorded the introductory laugh for De La Soul's collaboration with Gorillaz, "Feel Good Inc.".

Mase is a member of the Spitkicker collective, a group of artistically-minded people who release work by Spitkicker artists and engage in social, community-based activism.

Personal life
Mason is a native of Brooklyn, New York but grew up in Long Island where he met the other members of De La Soul. Son of Dorothy Robinson and Vincent Mason. He is the oldest of two siblings. His younger brother is Anthony Mason. Vincent currently lives in West Palm Beach, Florida. Father of four children: Marcus, Tre, Chauncey and Dayo Mason. His son, Tre Mason, was a running back for the Los Angeles Rams.

Aliases
All three members of De La Soul have a variety of known aliases and nicknames used throughout the group's career. The following are the most significant:

 P.A. Pasemaster Mase – The first alias used by Mason, "Pasemaster" (or "P.A.") was used as an alternative to "DJ". Though "Mase" is simply a nickname for Mason, Mason noted in an early interview that the name can be an acronym for "Making A Soul Effort". Later, with the release of De La Soul is Dead, the nickname "Maseo" became widely used.
 Plug Three – An early concept for 3 Feet High and Rising involved music being transmitted from Mars by three microphone plugs (each one representing a member of the group). Though this idea was abandoned, the titles "Plug One", "Plug Two" and "Plug Three" still became relevant on the album.

References

1970 births
African-American male rappers
American dance musicians
African-American DJs
Record producers from New York (state)
Grammy Award winners
Living people
Rappers from Brooklyn
Alternative hip hop musicians
De La Soul members
21st-century American rappers
21st-century American male musicians
21st-century African-American musicians
20th-century African-American people